The Netherlands Institute for the Near East (Dutch: Nederlands Instituut voor het Nabije Oosten; colloquially known by its abbreviation: NINO) is an institution for the advancement of the study of the Ancient Near East, Mesopotamia, Anatolia, and Egypt. It is an independent foundation with close ties to Leiden University, housed at the Faculty of Humanities. The institute was founded in 1939.
In 2017 the board of NINO decided to integrate the library into Leiden university and to transform the institute to a pure "research school".

Library 
The NINO library holds ca. 50.000 titles (scientific books and journals) in the fields of Assyriology, Egyptology, Near Eastern Archaeology and related fields. On 1 January 2018 the NINO library became part of Leiden University Libraries.

Publications and research 
NINO publishes the journal Bibliotheca Orientalis and the annuary Anatolica. Its current monograph series are PIHANS, Egyptological Publications and Achaemenid History. Fieldwork projects were and are carried out in Turkey, Syria and Iraq (survey and excavation in the Rania Plain, notably at Tell Shemshara).

Collections 
The institute holds several collections, the best known of which is the De Liagre Böhl Collection, which incorporates the largest collection of cuneiform tablets in the Netherlands. Some highlights from the Böhl Collection are on display at the nearby National Museum of Antiquities.

Subsidiary institute in Turkey 
Founded in 1958, the Nederlands Instituut in Turkije (NIT) is NINO's subsidiary institute in Istanbul.

See also
 Joris Borghouts, Dutch Egyptologist who was a research fellow at NINO

References

External links 
 Website NINO
 Nederlands Instituut in Turkije
 Exhibition "75 Years of the NINO" at the National Museum of Antiquities, Leiden, 2014-2015

Ancient Near East organizations
Leiden University
Research institutes in the Netherlands